The  is a railway line in Hiroshima Prefecture, Japan, operated by the West Japan Railway Company (JR West). It connects Fukuyama Station in Fukuyama to Miyoshi Station in Miyoshi.

Stations

Former connecting lines
  Sankō Line (closed 1 April 2018) – Miyoshi Station

Rolling stock
 105 series 2-car EMUs (Fukuyama–Fuchū)
 KiHa 120-300 single-car DMUs (Fuchū–Miyoshi)

History
The Ryobi Light Railway opened a  gauge line to Fuchu in 1914, and electrified it at 750 V DC in 1927. The company was nationalised in 1933, the same year the Japanese Government Railway opened the Shiomachi to Kisa section of the line (then as an extension of the Geibi Line). The two sections were connected with the opening of the Fuchu to Joge section in 1938.

The Fuchu to Shimo-Kawabe section was electrified in 1954, and whilst the voltage on the Fukuyama to Fuchu section was increased to 1500 V DC in 1961, the Fuchu to Shimo-Kawabe electrification was decommissioned the following year.

Freight services ceased in 1986, and in 1989, the 6,123 m Hattabara Tunnel and associated deviation were commissioned, shortening the route by 1.4 km.
 

References

 
Rail transport in Hiroshima Prefecture
Lines of West Japan Railway Company
1067 mm gauge railways in Japan
Railway lines opened in 1914
1914 establishments in Japan